Thimble Peak is a well-known landmark in the Santa Catalina Mountains north of Tucson, Arizona.  Thimble Peak rises from the foothills on the south side of the range.  To its east is Bear Canyon, while to its west is Sabino Canyon. The peak is in the Pusch Ridge Wilderness on the Coronado National Forest.

There are no trails to the peak itself.  The final ascent of the "cap" requires technical climbing skills, .

References

External links
 
 "Thimble Peak, AZ". HikeArizona.com

Santa Catalina Mountains
Mountains of Arizona
Geography of Tucson, Arizona
Landforms of Pima County, Arizona
Mountains of Pima County, Arizona